Măceșu de Jos is a commune in Dolj County, Oltenia, Romania with a population of 1,673 people. It is composed of two villages, Măceșu de Jos and Săpata.

References

Communes in Dolj County
Localities in Oltenia